Bingham Park is one of the chain of Porter Valley Parks in Sheffield, South Yorkshire, England.

Location 
Bingham Park is a park near Ecclesall and Ranmoor, Sheffield. It is the second (when travelling west from the city centre) of a line of parks and public open spaces along the Porter Brook, known as the Porter Valley Parks. To the north-east it is separated from the first in the chain, Endcliffe Park, by Rustlings Road, and to the west from Whiteley Woods by Highcliffe Road.

Description
Bingham Park is a grassy area high on a hillside with views across the valley, to Ranmoor. A footpath, leaving Rustlings Road serpents the valley bottom towards Whiteley Woods'. The footpath ends at Forge Dam Park, passing several dams of the Porter Brook, including Shepherd Wheel. The park possesses tennis courts, a mini golf course and a bowling green, an astroturf and has much woodland. The AstroTurf is commonly used by local footballers.

History
The first  of land which now forms Bingham Park was presented to Sheffield Corporation on 11 September 1911 by Sir John E Bingham. In 1927 the land around an early water-powered scythe works and its dam were incorporated into the park.

References

External links

Bingham Park, Friends of the Porter Valley

Parks in Sheffield
Forests and woodlands of South Yorkshire
Porter Brook